The 7th season of Nouvelle Star premiered on February 24, 2009, on M6. Soan Faya was declared the winner on June 9, 2009, beating out runner-up Leïla Aissaoui.

Changes & Early Process
Virginie Guilhaume became the new host of Nouvelle Star, succeeding previous host Virginie Efira. Philippe Manœuvre, André Manoukian, Lio, and Sinclair reprised their roles as judges on the show. The show also adopted a new opening title sequence, similar to that of American Idol.

Auditions were held from October 13 to December 6, 2008, in Marseille, Lille, Toulouse, Rennes, Lyon and Paris.

Contestants
Top 10 Finalists

 Soan Faya (27) - Winner
 Leïla Aissaoui (18)  - Runner-up
 Camélia Jordana (16)
 Thomas Bonneau (17)
 Dalé (24)
 Damien Vanni (29)
 Lary Lambert (20)
 Mahdi Jaggae (27)
 Mélissa Reffas (18)
 Yoann Pigny (21)

NOTE: Lary selected as the 10th finalist by the jury.

Semifinalists (Top 15)

 Antoine Vignette (25)
 Charlotte Robin (21)
 Maria Paz (21)
 Mickaël Frémeaux (25)
 Yasmina (17)

Eliminations - Top 10

Semifinalists
The jury selected fifteen contestants to move onto the live semifinal round, which aired April 7. At the end of the show, nine contestants were voted through to the top ten by the public. The jury then selected one contestant from the bottom six to advance to the finals.

Soan Faya was the winner of this season.

Advancing to the Top 10 (Public Vote) - Dalé • Camélia Jordana • Damien • Mahdi • Leïla • Soan • Mélissa • Thomas • Yoann

Jury's Choice - Lary

Finalists

Soan Faya

Soan Faya - 27 years old, auditioned in Paris.

Leïla Aissaoui
Leïla Aissaoui - 18 years old, auditioned in Rennes.

Camélia-Jordana
Camélia Jordana - 16 years old, auditioned in Marseille.

Thomas Bonneau
Thomas Bonneau - 17 years old, auditioned in Toulouse.

Dalé
Dalé - 24 years old, auditioned in Lyon.

Damien Vanni
Damien Vanni - 29 years old, auditioned in Lyon.

Lary Lambert
Lary Lambert - 20 years old, auditioned in Paris.

Mahdi Jaggae
Mahdi Jaggae - 27 years old, auditioned in Marseille.

Mélissa Reffas
Mélissa Reffas - 18 years old, auditioned in Lille.

Yoann Pigny
Yoann Pigny - 21 years old, auditioned in Paris.

Elimination chart

External links
Official Site

Season 07
2009 French television seasons